Ua Gormgaile was a medieval Irish bishop: he was Bishop of Cinél nEógain from 1149 to 1152.

References

People from County Londonderry
12th-century Roman Catholic bishops in Ireland
Bishops of Cinél nEógain
1152 deaths